"Photograph" is a song by American alternative rock band Weezer. It is the third and final single from the band's self-titled third album, Weezer. "Photograph" was released as the first single off the album in Japan instead of "Hash Pipe". The song enjoyed only modest success on the radio, peaking at #17 on Billboard's Modern Rock Tracks chart.

During many live shows in 2005, the band would close out their first set by having Weezer drummer Patrick Wilson take lead vocals and guitar on "Photograph" while frontman Rivers Cuomo played drums.

Music video
The music video for the song was directed by Weezer.com webmaster and longtime friend of the band Karl Koch. It consists of footage shot while the band was touring for The Green Album. Among the notable footage is Rivers Cuomo playing soccer, Brian Bell attempting to skateboard and juggle (not at the same time), Patrick Wilson riding a Razor Scooter, a brief clip of the duo from Tenacious D running onstage during a Weezer show and a scene with Rivers playing a prank on new bassist Scott Shriner. Although Mikey Welsh plays bass and sings backup vocals on the studio recording, Shriner is in the video, as Welsh had left the band at that point. During the very end of the video, when Cuomo is playing the prank on Shriner, a demo of "Death & Destruction" can be heard in the background. This song would later surface on the band's next album Maladroit. The video is featured on Video Capture Device, the band's DVD.

Reception
Stephen Thomas Erlewine of AllMusic thought that "Photograph" was one of the 4 highlights on the album.

Drowned in Sound writer Terry Bezer wrote: "'Photograph' is all 1950's happiness and brings back shades of 94's outstanding 'Buddy Holly'.

AXS thought that "Photograph" was the band's eighth best song.

In other media
The song was played during the end credits for the 2008 comedy film, Drillbit Taylor.

The song was played in the Hung episode "A Man, a Plan".

Track list
Radio Only Promo CD
 "Photograph" (Radio Edit) – 2:12
 "Photograph" (Video) – 2:20

Japan Retail CD
 "Photograph" – 2:19
 "Christmas Celebration" – 2:22

References

External links

2001 singles
Weezer songs
Songs written by Rivers Cuomo
2001 songs
Geffen Records singles
Song recordings produced by Ric Ocasek